Cyangugu (formerly Shangugu) is a city and capital of the Rusizi District in Western Province, Rwanda. The city lies at the southern end of Lake Kivu, and is contiguous with Bukavu, Democratic Republic of the Congo, but separated from it by the Ruzizi River. Two bridges and a dam cross the river frontier.

The settlement has two main areas: Cyangugu itself is the low-density district on the lake shore, while Kamembe, the higher density industrial and transport centre is further inland and to the north. Kamembe Airport serves the city with flights 11 times a week to Kigali.

The city lies near Nyungwe Forest, a popular tourist destination, being one of the last remaining forest areas of Rwanda and home to chimpanzees and many other species of primate.

In 2015 the city had a population of approximately 63,883.

References

 
Western Province, Rwanda
Populated places in Rwanda
Populated places on Lake Kivu
Ruzizi River
Rusizi District
Democratic Republic of the Congo–Rwanda border crossings